Christophe Moulin may refer to:

 Christophe Moulin (television presenter) (born 1967), French television presenter
 Christophe Moulin (footballer, born 1958), Swiss footballer and manager
 Christophe Moulin (footballer, born 1971), Swiss footballer and manager